William Benedict Friend (October 22, 1931 – April 2, 2015) was an American prelate of the Roman Catholic Church.  He served as the first bishop of the new Diocese of Shreveport in Louisiana from 1986 to 2006.  He previously served as auxiliary bishop and then bishop of the Diocese of Alexandria-Shreveport from 1979 to 1986.

Biography

Early life 
William Friend was born on October 22, 1931, in Miami, Florida.  He was ordained to the priesthood by Cardinal James Gibbons on May 7, 1959, for the Diocese of Mobile-Birmingham, Alabama.

Auxiliary Bishop and Bishop of Alexandria-Shreveport 
On August 31, 1979, Pope John Paul II appointed Friend as an auxiliary bishop of the Diocese of Alexandria-Shreveport and titular bishop of Pomaria. He was consecrated by Archbishop Thomas Joseph Toolen  on October 30, 1979. On November 17, 1982, John Paul II appointed him as bishop of the same diocese.

Bishop of Shreveport 
John Paul II erected the Diocese of Shreveport on June 16, 1986, and appointed Friend as its first bishop.  He was installed as bishop on July 30, 1986.

On October 22, 2006, Bishop Friend sent the mandatory letter to Pope Benedict XVI resigning the diocese as he had reached the age of 75. His resignation was accepted on December 20, 2006. Bishop Friend remained at the helm of the diocese as apostolic administrator until a new bishop was appointed.

Retirement and legacy 
On April 1, 2008 Pope Benedict named Michael Duca as the new bishop of the diocese ending Friend's duties as apostolic administrator. On April 2, 2015, William Friend died at his home in Coral Springs, Florida.

Notes

Episcopal succession

1931 births
2015 deaths
Roman Catholic bishops of Alexandria
People from Miami
People from Shreveport, Louisiana
20th-century Roman Catholic bishops in the United States
21st-century Roman Catholic bishops in the United States
Religious leaders from Florida
Catholics from Florida
People from Coral Springs, Florida